is a Japanese freelance actor and singer. His ex-wife is model Risa Hirako.

Filmography

TV series

NHK General TV

NHK Educational TV

Nippon TV

Tokyo Broadcasting System

Fuji Television

TV Asahi

TV Tokyo

Wowow

Amazon Prime Video

Netflix

Films

Dubbing
The West Wing (seasons 1-2), Sam Seaborn (Rob Lowe)

References

External links
 
Eisaku Yoshida on NHK Archives 

Japanese male singers
1969 births
Living people
People from Hadano, Kanagawa
Male actors from Kanagawa Prefecture
Musicians from Kanagawa Prefecture
Watanabe Entertainment